Hyaena Cave is a cave in the British Overseas Territory of Gibraltar.  It forms part of the Gorham's Cave complex which has been nominated for UNESCO World Heritage Site status.

Description
Hyaena Cave is one of four caves which together make up the Gorham's Cave complex which has been nominated to become a UNESCO World Heritage Site, the others being Vanguard, Gorham's and Bennett's Cave. Hyaena Cave, like the other three in the complex, has been gradually filled with sand that has been blown in through the entrance over thousands of years. These sands remain where they fall and over time they build up to remarkable depths. In the case of Vanguard Cave and Gorham's Cave the deposits are both more than seventeen metres deep. The sands record the environment from 15,000 to 55,000 years ago when the coastline was very different.

References

Caves of Gibraltar
Neanderthal sites
Limestone caves
Archaeological sites in Gibraltar